Cheng Youshu (1924 – 5 May 2021) was a Chinese diplomat and poet. Cheng was fluent in English and Danish.

Biography
Cheng was born in Beijing in 1924, with her ancestral hometown in Xiangxiang, Hunan. Her father Cheng Shewo was a newspaperman. She is the second of five children. Her sister, Cheng Zhifan (born in 1928), is French Chinese. Her brother Cheng Siwei is a Chinese politician.

Cheng Youshu began writing poems at the age of 13. After high school, Cheng was accepted into Saint John's University, Shanghai, where she joined the Wenhui Fellowship—a Christian Fellowship.

In 1945, Cheng and her schoolmate founded the Yehuo Poetry Club. In May 1945, Cheng joined the Chinese Communist Party, and served in the New Fourth Army in Shanghai.

In 1948, Cheng went to Hong Kong to work as a reporter. While in Hong Kong, Cheng met her future husband, Chen Luzhi. Cheng married Chen in Hong Kong. They have four children.

In October 1949, Cheng moved in Guangzhou, her father went to Taiwan with Kuomintang.

After the founding of the Communist State, Cheng worked in the Chinese Foreign Ministry. From 1955 to 1961, Cheng worked in India as a diplomat. In 1984, Cheng went to Denmark with her husband when he served as China's Ambassador to Denmark.

Cheng died in Beijing on 5 May 2021.

Works

Poems
 The Surviving Rice

Translation
 Nb—Some Memories of Niels Henrik David Bohr

Awards
 The Surviving Rice – 3rd Lu Xun Literary Prize (2005)

References

1924 births
2021 deaths
Chinese diplomats
Chinese expatriates in British Hong Kong
Chinese expatriates in Denmark
Chinese expatriates in India
St. John's University, Shanghai alumni
Writers from Beijing